Champlain was an electoral district of the Legislative Assembly of the Parliament of the Province of Canada, in Canada East.  It was on the north shore of the Saint Lawrence River, with the town of Champlain being the main centre of the district.

The electoral district was established in 1841, when the Province of Canada was created by the merger of Lower Canada and Upper Canada by the Union Act, 1840. It was based on the previous electoral district of the same name for the Legislative Assembly of Lower Canada.

Champlain was represented by one Member in the Legislative Assembly.  The electoral district was abolished in 1867 upon the creation of Canada and the province of Quebec.

Boundaries 

The electoral district of Champlain was located on the north shore of the Saint Lawrence River, centred on the town of Champlain (in the current Mauricie area), and close to Trois-Rivières.

The Union Act, 1840 merged the two provinces of Lower Canada and Upper Canada into the Province of Canada, with a single Parliament.  The separate parliaments of Lower Canada and Upper Canada were abolished.

The Union Act provided that the pre-existing electoral boundaries of Lower Canada and Upper Canada would continue to be used in the new Parliament, unless altered by the Union Act itself. The Champlain electoral district of Lower Canada was not altered by the Act, and therefore continued with the same boundaries which had been set by a statute of Lower Canada in 1829:

Elections were held at the "Ferry nearest the River Saint Lawrence on the north east of the River Batiscan."

Champlain was a single-member constituency.

Members of the Legislative Assembly (1841-1867) 

The following were the members of the Legislative Assembly from Champlain.

Notes

Abolition 

The district was abolished on July 1, 1867, when the British North America Act, 1867 came into force, splitting the Province of Canada into Quebec and Ontario.  It was succeeded by electoral districts of the same name in the House of Commons of Canada and the Legislative Assembly of Quebec.

Footnotes

Electoral districts of Canada East
1841 establishments in Canada